The Battle of Imbros was a naval action that took place during the First World War. The battle occurred on 20 January 1918 when an Ottoman squadron engaged a flotilla of the British Royal Navy off the island of Imbros in the Aegean Sea. A lack of heavy Allied warships in the area allowed the Ottoman battlecruiser  and light cruiser  to sortie into the Mediterranean and attack the Royal Navy monitors and destroyers at Imbros before assaulting the naval base at Mudros.

Although the Ottoman forces managed to complete their objective of destroying the monitors located at Imbros, the battle turned sour for them as they sailed through a minefield while withdrawing. Midilli was sunk and Yavûz Sultân Selîm heavily damaged. Although Yavûz Sultân Selîm managed to beach herself within the Dardanelles, she was subjected to days of air attacks until she was towed to safety. With the most modern cruiser of the Ottoman Navy sunk and its only battlecruiser out of action, the battle effectively curtailed the Ottoman Navy's offensive capability until the end of the war.

Prelude
By January 1918, the situation for the Ottoman Army in Palestine had begun to worsen. The new German commander of the Ottoman Black Sea fleet, Rebeur Paschwitz, decided to try to relieve Allied naval pressure on Palestine by making a sortie out of the Dardanelles. Several British naval elements of the Aegean Squadron had been taking refuge in Kusu Bay off the islands of Imbros, and they were a prime target for an Ottoman raid. After raiding what shipping could be found at Imbros, Rebeur-Paschwitz turned to Mudros and attack the British naval base there. The Allied force guarding the Dardanelles consisted of a few heavy British and French units as well as several monitors tasked with coastal bombardment. Escorting the monitors were several British destroyers. Taking advantage of the absence of the British battleship, the Germans and Ottomans decided to dispatch the battlecruiser Yavûz Sultân Selîm (ex-) and the light cruiser Midilli (ex-) to attack the area. Agamemnon was nearby at Mudros, but she was much too slow to chase down the Ottoman ships if they wanted to avoid engaging her.

Without Agamemnon and Lord Nelson the British were severely outgunned in comparison to the Ottoman ships. Tigress and Lizard both were armed with two 4-inch guns, two 12 pounders, and two 21-inch torpedo tubes. They were swift ships capable of making  at best speed. The two monitors present at Imbros were better suited for coastal bombardment than naval combat, though their heavy guns gave them an element of firepower the destroyers lacked. M28 was a smaller vessel than Raglan and as such carried a lighter armament, sporting a single 9.2-inch cannon, one 12 pounder, as well as a six pounder anti-aircraft gun. The  weak point of both Raglan and M28 were their low top speeds of  respectively, giving them little capability of escaping an Ottoman raid. In contrast to the British force, the Ottoman vessels were both fast and heavily armed. Yavûz Sultân Selîm was the most powerful ship in the Ottoman fleet with a top speed of 25.5 knots, ten 283 mm guns, twelve 150 mm guns, a dozen 8.8-centimetre guns, and four torpedo tubes. Thus, with no heavy units available to repel them, there was little in the means of effective Allied opposition when the Ottomans set out on their mission.

Battle
Setting out towards Imbros, Yavûz Sultân Selîm struck a mine on transit to the island, but the damage was insignificant and the two Ottoman vessels were able to continue their mission. Yavûz Sultân Selîm then proceeded to bombard the British signal station at Kephalo Point while Midilli was sent ahead to guard the entrance of Kusu Bay. As Yavûz Sultân Selîm and Midilli approached Kusu Bay, they were sighted by the destroyer HMS Lizard at 5:30 am. Lizard attempted to engage the Ottoman ships, but could not close to torpedo range due to heavy fire from her opponents. Yavûz Sultân Selîm soon sighted the two British monitors taking refuge in the bay, and broke off from Lizard to engage them. As Yavûz Sultân Selîm attacked the monitors, Midilli continued to duel with Lizard who was then joined by the destroyer HMS Tigress. Lizard and Tigress attempted to shield the monitors from Yavûz Sultân Selîm by laying a smoke screen, but this was ineffective. The monitors were both much too slow to evade Yavûz Sultân Selîm and she was able to score numerous hits on Raglan, hitting her foretop and killing her gunnery and direction officers. Raglan attempted to return fire with its 6- and 14-inch guns, but scored no hits on the German vessels before her main armament was knocked out when a shell pierced its casemate and ignited the ammunition within it. Shortly after she was disarmed, Raglan was hit in her magazine by one of Yavûz Sultân Selîms 11-inch shells, causing the monitor to sink. After Raglan was sunk, the Ottoman battlecruiser began turned her attention to HMS M28, striking her amidships and setting her alight before she was sunk when her magazine exploded at 6:00 am. With the two monitors sunk, the Ottomans decided to break off the engagement and head south in an attempt to raid the allied naval base at Mudros.

Upon withdrawing from Kusu Bay, the Ottoman force accidentally sailed into a minefield and were shadowed by the two British destroyers they had previously engaged. In addition to the destroyers, several British and Greek aircraft were launched from Mudros to engage the Germans. Greek ace Aristeidis Moraitinis, escorting two Sopwith Baby seaplanes, fought ten enemy aircraft and shot down three enemy seaplanes with his Sopwith Camel. With the approach of enemy aircraft Midilli, which had been following Yavûz Sultân Selîm, took the lead so as to take advantage of her heavier anti-aircraft armament. Midilli then struck a mine near her aft funnel, and shortly afterwards Yavûz Sultân Selîm hit one as well.  Within half an hour Midilli had struck four more mines and began to sink. Yavûz Sultân Selîm attempted to rescue Midilli but also struck a mine and was forced to withdraw. Fleeing towards the safety of the Dardanelles, Yavûz Sultân Selîm was pursued by Lizard and Tigress. In order to cover Yavûz Sultân Selîm four Ottoman destroyers and an old cruiser rushed out to engage the British destroyers. After the lead Ottoman destroyer began to take hits, the Ottoman squadron was forced to withdraw back up the Dardanelles.  As the British destroyers approached Cape Helles, they were fired upon by Ottoman shore batteries and withdrew.

Although they managed to score two hits against the battlecruiser, the Ottoman ship was by this time near the coast. The combined efforts from ten Ottoman seaplanes as well as heavy anti-aircraft fire were able to drive off the air attacks, downing one Sopwith Baby and damaging another aircraft. The four Ottoman destroyers returned and guarded Yavûz Sultân Selîm as she sailed up the Dardnelles. Severely damaged, the Ottoman battlecruiser ran aground on a sandbar off Nagara Point and became stranded. The next six days saw further air attacks by Allied seaplanes against the Ottoman battlecruiser, with six hits being scored against her. Ottoman seaplanes and heavy shore batteries responded to the raids and were able to guard Yavûz Sultân Selîm and beat back the air attacks. Despite the air raids, Yavûz Sultân Selîm suffered only superficial damage from them as the  bombs used by the British were too small to be effective. Allied commanders proposed plans for a submarine raid against the battlecruiser, but the only submarine attached to the Aegean squadron, had mechanical problems and was inoperative. A raid into the Dardanelles was therefore postponed until a working submarine could be dispatched to the area.

Aftermath
With no way to free herself, Yavûz Sultân Selîm remained stranded on the sandbar until 26 January when the  finally arrived and towed her back into the Black Sea. In one last effort to destroy the battlecruiser, the British sent the submarine  into the Dardanelles on 27 January. Yavûz Sultân Selîm had already left the area, and so E14 began sailing back to Allied waters after discovering the battlecruiser's absence. Sighting an Ottoman freighter, the British submarine attempted to torpedo her. The second torpedo fired exploded prematurely. The resulting explosion damaged the submarine, forcing her to try to flee the straits. She came under heavy fire from nearby Ottoman shore batteries and was eventually beached with her commander, Geoffrey Saxton White, and another sailor killed and seven captured. White was posthumously awarded the Victoria Cross for his efforts to beach the submarine and save her crew.

Although the Ottoman force destroyed the two monitors as planned, their losses traversing the minefield after the engagement in Kusu Bay offset these successes considerably.  With Midilli sunk and Yavûz Sultân Selîm severely damaged, the threat of the Ottoman Navy to the Allies was greatly reduced for the remainder of the war. Despite the removal of these two vessels from the Ottoman battle line, the commanders of the British Aegean Squadron were criticized for sending their battleships so far from the Dardanelles. Had either Agamemnon or Lord Nelson been nearby during the Ottoman raid, Yavûz Sultân Selîm might have been destroyed.

Notes

References

Conflicts in 1918
Mediterranean naval operations of World War I
Maritime incidents in 1918
Naval battles of World War I involving the Ottoman Empire
Naval battles of World War I involving the United Kingdom
History of Çanakkale Province
Imbros
January 1918 events
Imbros